The 2004 Minnesota Twins season was the 104th season in the franchise's history and its 44th season in the Twin Cities. The Twins were managed by Ron Gardenhire and played in the Metrodome.

The Twins finished with a 92-70 record and won the American League Central division. They advanced to the American League Division Series, but they lost the series to the New York Yankees in four games. It was the second year in a row in which the Yankees eliminated the Twins in the ALDS.

Twins pitcher Johan Santana won the 2004 Cy Young Award on a unanimous vote.

Offseason
November 14, 2003: Traded catcher A. J. Pierzynski and cash to the San Francisco Giants. Received Pitchers Joe Nathan, Francisco Liriano, and Boof Bonser.
November 20, 2003: Selected pitcher Matt Guerrier off waivers from the Pittsburgh Pirates.
December 3, 2003: Traded pitcher Eric Milton to the Philadelphia Phillies. Received pitcher Carlos Silva, IF Nick Punto, and a player to be named later. The Philadelphia Phillies sent Bobby Korecky (minors) (December 17) to the Minnesota Twins to complete the trade.
December 18, 2003: Signed Henry Blanco as a free agent.
January 8, 2004: Signed Aaron Fultz as a free agent.
February 6, 2004: Signed José Offerman as a free agent.

Spring training
The Twins posted a 20–10 record in spring training, the best of any major league team in 2004. This includes split-squad games but not ties or exhibition games.

Regular season

Offense

For a playoff team, the offense was not strong.  This was partly due to injuries and starters absent from the lineup.  Lew Ford surprised many by batting .299 in his first full year in the major leagues.  Free agent acquisition José Offerman saw a majority of time in the designated hitter spot, but hit only .256 with two home runs.  Shannon Stewart did hit .304, but injuries limited him to 378 at bats.  In 107 at bats, Mauer was able to hit .307.  In his absence, catcher Henry Blanco hit only .206.  First baseman Doug Mientkiewicz's hitting continued to decline, as he hit .246 with five home runs before being dealt to the Boston Red Sox.

Nine players hit ten or more home runs.  When the Twins hit their record 225 homers in 1963, only eight players reached double figures.

Pitching

Brad Radke was the opening day starter, but he was soon overshadowed by Johan Santana's Cy Young year.  Radke, Santana, and Carlos Silva anchored the starting rotation.  Unfortunately, Kyle Lohse had a bad year that saw his ERA balloon to 5.34, while the fifth spot in the rotation was nebulous.  (41-year-old Terry Mulholland made 15 starts, while Seth Greisinger made nine.)

The Twins set their club record of 32 consecutive scoreless innings in June, which included back-to-back-to-back shutouts by Radke, Santana and Lohse.

In the bullpen, Joe Nathan blew everyone away during his first year as a closer at any level, earning 44 saves with a 1.62 ERA.  Juan Rincón and J. C. Romero continued playing as excellent set-up men, while the rest of the bullpen was weaker.  Romero set a Twins record by going 36 innings over 32 appearances without allowing a run to score.

Santana finished the year with 13 straight wins without a loss, then went 1-0 with a no-decision in the American League Division Series. He set the Twins record with 265 strikeouts this season.

Defense

Blanco and Mauer (when he played) were solid catchers, both with .991 fielding percentages.  Mientkiewicz was a one-time Gold Glove winner, but his successor Justin Morneau surprised people with his .995 fielding percentage.  Luis Rivas was dependable at second base, while Cristian Guzmán could turn exceptional plays at shortstop.  (It was the routine ones that fooled him.)  Corey Koskie was defensively average, while the outfield quartet of Hunter, Jacque Jones, Shannon Stewart and Ford were solid – especially Hunter, who won a Gold Glove.

Season standings

Record vs. opponents

Notable Transactions
April 9: The Toronto Blue Jays selected Mike Nakamura off waivers.
April 11: Signed Joe Beimel as a free agent.
April 13: Signed Terry Mulholland as a free agent.
July 31, 2004: As part of a 4-team trade, traded Doug Mientkiewicz to the Boston Red Sox. Received Justin Jones (minors) from the Chicago Cubs. In addition, the Boston Red Sox sent Nomar Garciaparra and Matt Murton to the Chicago Cubs; the Montreal Expos sent Orlando Cabrera to the Boston Red Sox; and the Chicago Cubs sent Brendan Harris, Alex Gonzalez, and Francis Beltrán to the Montreal Expos.
November 23, 2004: Signed Juan Castro as a free agent.
November 24, 2004: Signed Mike Redmond as a free agent.

Roster

Post Season

The Twins entered and exited the postseason nearly the same as the previous season, losing to the Yankees, 3 games to 1 in the Division Series. The Twins won the first game by a score of 2-0, with starting pitcher Johan Santana getting the win.  However, the Twins lost the next three games, with the Yankees taking the series 3 games to 1.  Game 1 of this series represents the Twins most recent postseason victory. Game 2 began a 18 game postseason losing streak for the team, tied with the 1975-79 Chicago Blackhawks for the longest such losing streak in North American sports history. The Twins’ streak is still currently active. The Yankees would go on to be upset by the Boston Red Sox on their way to breaking the curse.

See 2004 American League Division Series.

Player stats

Batting

Starters by position
Note: Pos = Position; G = Games played; AB = At bats; H = Hits; Avg. = Batting average; HR = Home runs; RBI = Runs batted in

Other batters
Note: G = Games played; AB = At bats; H = Hits; Avg. = Batting average; HR = Home runs; RBI = Runs batted in

Pitching

Starting pitchers
Note: G = Games; IP = Innings pitched; W = Wins; L = Losses; ERA = Earned run average; SO = Strikeouts

Other pitchers
Note: G = Games pitched; IP = Innings pitched; W = Wins; L = Losses; ERA = Earned run average; SO = Strikeouts

Relief pitchers
Note: G = Games; W = Wins; L = Losses; SV = Saves; ERA = Earned run average; SO = Strikeouts

Miscellaneous

Johan Santana won the Cy Young Award, becoming the third player in Minnesota Twins history to do so. The first two were Jim Perry in 1970 and Frank Viola in 1988.
The lone representative of the Twins in the All-Star Game was closer Joe Nathan.
On July 25, Paul Molitor was inducted into the Baseball Hall of Fame.  He is the second St. Paul native to enter (following Dave Winfield) and, from 1996 on, has played with, coached for and managed the Twins.
The highest paid Twin in 2004 was Brad Radke at $10,750,000; followed by Torii Hunter  at $6,500,000.
Earl Battey was inducted into the Twins Hall of Fame.

Other post-season awards
Calvin R. Griffith Award (Most Valuable Twin) – Johan Santana
Joseph W. Haynes Award (Twins Pitcher of the Year) – Johan Santana
Bill Boni Award (Twins Outstanding Rookie) – Joe Mauer
Charles O. Johnson Award (Most Improved Twin) – Juan Rincón
Dick Siebert Award (Upper Midwest Player of the Year) – Keith Foulke
The above awards are voted on by the Twin Cities chapter of the BBWAA
Carl R. Pohlad Award (Outstanding Community Service) – Torii Hunter
Sherry Robertson Award (Twins Outstanding Farm System Position Player) – Jason Kubel
Jim Rantz Award (Twins Outstanding Farm System Pitcher) – Scott Baker

Farm system

References

External links
Player stats from www.baseball-reference.com
Team info from www.baseball-almanac.com
Twins history since 2000, from www.mlb.com 
2004 Standings

Minnesota Twins seasons
Minnesota Twins
American League Central champion seasons
2004 in sports in Minnesota